U.S. Route 160 (US 160) is a U.S. Highway in the extreme northwestern corner of New Mexico near the Four Corners area.

Route description

US 160 enters New Mexico from Arizona on a two-lane highway that heads northeast through the arid, rolling plains of the Navajo section of the Colorado Plateau. Approximately  into the state is an intersection with New Mexico State Road 597 (NM 597), a short highway that leads to the Four Corners Monument, which lies on the quadripoint of Arizona, New Mexico, Colorado, and Utah. US 160 continues to the northeast and descends into the San Juan River valley, but the highway crosses into Colorado before reaching the river.

History

US 160 was originally designated as US 164 in 1965. A proposal to renumber the highway to US 160 was deferred by the American Association of State Highway Officials (AASHO; now AASHTO) in 1969 and approved the following year.

Major intersections

References

External links

End of US Highway 164 at Dale Sanderson's U.S. Highway Ends

60-1
Transportation in San Juan County, New Mexico
 New Mexico